Kipoi (before 1928: Μπάγια – Bagia) is a village in the region of Zagori. It belongs to the municipal unit of Tymfi, Ioannina regional unit, Greece. The Greek name derives from the many gardens in the surrounding areas (Greek Κήποι=Gardens). The name "Bagia" is Slavic and means "warm (and low) place". The village has the lowest altitude of all Zagori village and is surrounded by rivers. It is built on a rocky hill, in the southern end of Vikos Gorge.

History and culture 

Kipoi was once the centre of Zagori. After the Balkan Wars and the liberation of Epirus in 1913, the people of Kipi demanded that Kipoi becomes the capital of Zagori, because it is the most central village and because it once was the "capital".

In Kipoi, the traditional architectural style of Epirus is well preserved, with stone built roads and dwellings. The village is surrounded by stone bridges. In the entrance lies Kontodimos bridge, down in the valley, the beautiful Milos bridge connects the village to the old water mill and Petsonis bridge in the exit towards Fragades. One can find more bridges on the old paths towards Elati, Dikorfo, Negades and Tsepelovo. Not far from the villages lies a three arched stone bridge, of the 18th century (illustration). The bridge is also a unique tourist attraction of today, on the local road to central Zagori, just out of the village.

Orthodox Albanians, locally called "Arvanites", have settled the village after the 15th century, later assimilating into the local population. Sarakatsani have settled at the beginning of the 20th century.

Today, the museum of the famous collector Agapios Tolis is located in Kipoi, where more than 40.000 exhibits are included.

External links
  Information about Kipoi.
  Folkloric museum of Agapios Tolis (Greek).

Bibliography

References 

Populated places in Ioannina (regional unit)